Chaudière Falls is a  waterfall in Lévis, Quebec along the Chaudière River. It is part of the regional Parc des Chutes-de-la-Chaudière, which features a  suspension footbridge standing 23 metres over the river. There are walking and bicycle trails along the river.

Gallery

See also
List of waterfalls of Canada

References

External links

Lévis, Quebec
Waterfalls of Quebec
Landforms of Chaudière-Appalaches
Tourist attractions in Chaudière-Appalaches